Stadio Comunale is a multi-purpose stadium in Chiavari, Italy. It is mainly used for football matches and hosts the home matches of local Italian Serie B club Virtus Entella. The stadium has a capacity of 5,535 spectators.

Football venues in Italy
Multi-purpose stadiums in Italy
Virtus Entella
1933 establishments in Italy
Sports venues completed in 1933